The Battle of Sangan was an engagement involving the Loyalist forces of Tahmasp II of Safavid Iran led by Nader and the Abdali Afghan Tribes in and further beyond southern Khorasan in the autumn of 1727. This armed struggle was one of the initial battles between the resurgent Safavid cause and that of the Afghans. The engagement technically ended in a Safavid victory.

Background 
The Hotaki invasion of Iran in 1722 had thrown Khorasan into chaos. It was reunified under the capable general, Tahmasp Qoli Khan (the eventual Nader Shah). Nader intended to consolidate his gains push further south and secure Sangan, Khaf and Behdadin. Sangan and Behdadin were ruled by a branch of the Herat Abdalis, who had rebelled against the Safavid government 11 years prior. In addition to this, a rebellion broke out in Qa'in that had to be taken care of. This rebellion was led by a Sistani chieftain named Husain Sultan, who was incited to revolt by Malek Mahmoud Sistani and was supported by some of Mahmoud's relatives (namely his brother Kalb 'Ali and his son Luft 'Ali).

The battle
On July 27 or August 5 1727 Nader Shah left Mashhad for Qa'in with 800 men. Nader soon forced Hussein Sultan to submit but Kalb 'Ali and Luft 'Ali escaped and fled to Ashraf at Isfahan. From there he marched via Esfedan towards Behdadin. The march towards Behdadin was tough, as Astarabadi puts it:

Those bandits fled precipitately from his army, which advanced, as the poet says, like a flame that consumes all before it. He came in a few days to one of those vast deserts of land, that are so frequent in Asia ; where, mounted on a camel, with a lance in his hand, he led his soldiers without intermission, and held in common with them the toil and danger of these fatiguing marches.

As it was the middle of summer, water was scarce and his cannon kept sinking into the sand. Iran at this time didn't have many navigable waterways and the roads it did have weren't able to move heavy artillery long distances, which Nader would struggle with. However, he was able to retrieve the cannons from the sand through a coordinated effort by his men. Nader reached Behdadin on September 9 and stormed it. Soon after, the Sangani Afghans submitted to Nader. However, it turns out that they had feigned submission and Nader had to besiege Sangan in order to force them to submit.

During the siege, Nader was watching the artillery fire upon the fortress. However, a gunner accidentally set a nearby cannon off prematurely. The resulting shrapnel killed the gunner and a few other observers. Miraculously though Nader was unharmed as he backed away before the cannon exploded. On September 22, September 30, or October 1 Sangan fell to the Safavids, and the population was massacred for faking submission. However, an Abdali army numbering 7-8,000 men marched towards Sangan to relieve the fortress. When Nader heard of this, he sent a force to the village of Niazabad to face the Afghans. The battle lasted four days. Most of Nader's men were in trenches of 500 of his best cavalry would maneuver and fight off the Abdali troops. After the end of the 4 days the Abdali forces withdrew to Herat. However, Nader didn't pursue the Abdalis and withdrew to Mashhad, as his position there was still far from secure.

Aftermath 
The expedition did not in itself provide any strategic gains as such and Nader withdrew into upper Khorasan to re-consolidate and plan an offensive against Herat.

See also
 Military of the Afsharid dynasty of Persia
 Kandahar
 Afsharid dynasty
 Hotaki dynasty
 Durrani dynasty
 Lurs

References

Sources
 Axworthy, Michael The Sword of Persia: Nader Shah, from Tribal Warrior to Conquering Tyrant Hardcover 348 pages (26 July 2006) Publisher: I.B. Tauris  Language: English 
Lockhart, Laurence The Fall of the Safavi Dynasty and the Afghan Occupation of Persia Hardcover 584 pages (1958) Publisher: Cambridge University Press Language: English
Lockhart, Lawrence (2011), Nadir Shah: A Critical Study Based Mainly Upon Contemporary Sources pp. 28–29.
Mahdī Khān Astarābādī (1773) The History of the life of Nader Shah, King of Persia. Extracted from an Eastern manuscript, which was translated into French by the order of His Majesty the King of Denmark. pp. 12–13
Nejatie, Sajjad (2017) The Pearl of Pearls: The Abdālī-Durrānī Confederacy and Its Transformation under Aḥmad Shāh, Durr-i Durrān pg.262

Battles involving Safavid Iran
1727 in military history
1727 in Asia
History of Razavi Khorasan Province
1727 in Iran